Svenska Serien 1911–12, part of the 1911–12 Swedish football season, was the second Svenska Serien season played. Örgryte IS won the league ahead of runners-up Djurgårdens IF, while Göteborgs FF, Mariebergs IK, Vikingarnas FK and IFK Eskilstuna were relegated.

Issues 
The league season suffered from a large number of issues. Göteborgs FF and Mariebergs IK replaced IFK Eskilstuna and Vikingarnas FK which both withdrew after only one round, their two match results are not included in the table of the other teams. Mariebergs IK then withdrew after six matches, but were allowed back in again after a while.

The league was finally abandoned due to trouble finding days to play the remaining matches as the national team prepared for the 1912 Olympic football tournament by playing test matches, however the incomplete table is considered the final table.

The following ten matches were not played: Djurgårdens IF–Mariebergs IK, Göteborgs FF–Mariebergs IK, IFK Norrköping–Djurgårdens IF, Mariebergs IK–Göteborgs FF, IFK Göteborg–Mariebergs IK, Göteborgs FF–AIK, Örgryte IS–Mariebergs IK, AIK–Göteborgs FF, Göteborgs FF–IFK Norrköping and Mariebergs IK–IFK Norrköping.

Participating clubs

League table

Promotions, relegations and qualifications

Results

References 

Print

Online

1911-12
Sweden
1